The Faroe Islands Cup 2008 was played between March 15 and June 14, 2008. It was won by EB/Streymur, who successively defended their title.

Only the first teams of Faroese football clubs were allowed to participate. The First Round involved only teams from second and third deild. Teams from the highest two divisions entered the competition in the Second Round.

First round

Second round

Quarterfinals

Semifinals

First legs

Second legs

Final

Top goalscorers

External links
 Faroe Islands Cup on rsssf.com

Faroe Islands Cup seasons
Cup
Faroe Islands Cup, 2008